The twenty-five cent was a coin worth a quarter of decimal Dutch guilder. It was used from the decimalisation of the currency in 1817 until the Netherlands adopted the euro as sole currency in 2002. The last minting was in 2001. The coin was the third-smallest denomination of the guilder when the currency was withdrawn, and the largest of a value less than one guilder.

At first, the coin was minted with a layer of silver alloy. During the reign of King William III of the Netherlands the coin became smaller from 1877 onwards. The new size of the coin would be the final size, except during the German occupation of the Netherlands, when the coin was much bigger.

From 1948 onwards, the coin was minted using nickel. Its last design originated from 1980,  with Queen Beatrix as the monarch on its obverse.

It was nicknamed the kwartje. The nickname came from the Dutch word for a quarter (kwart), and the diminutive suffix -je (similar to the English -ie).

Dimensions and weight

Source

Versions during the kingdom of the Netherlands

Source

References

External links
Obverses and reverses

Guilder
Coins of the Netherlands
Twenty-five-cent coins